Erastus Sabinus Prosser (September 2, 1809 – May 11, 1888) was an American politician from New York.

Early life
Prosser was born on September 2, 1809 in the area which was separated as the Town of Westerlo, Albany County, New York in 1815. His father was a physician with a country practice.

At an early age he removed to Albany, New York, and served as a clerk in the forwarding house of Dows & Cary there.

Career
In 1845, Prosser moved to Buffalo, New York, and continued his business there until about 1858 when he retired. He remained involved in canal matters, including the Erie Canal, throughout his life.

Prosser entered politics as a Democrat, but his "Anti-slavery proclivities led him into the support of Mr. Van Buren for the Presidency" and he joined the Free Soil Party in 1848, and the Republican Party upon its foundation in 1855. He was a member of the New York State Senate (31st D.) from 1859 to 1861, sitting in the 82nd, 83rd and 84th New York State Legislatures.

He was a delegate to the New York State Constitutional Convention of 1867 to 1868.

Personal life

Prosser was married three times and in 1877 was sued by Anna A. Hickey, a woman who claimed he proposed but refused to marry her. In 1834, he married Lucy Wilbur, and they had four children, including:

 Henry Wilbur Prosser, who Anna Fay.
 Ms. Prosser, who married John Armstrong of New York.
 Harriet Prosser (1836–1909), who married to Chief Judge William C. Ruger.
 Anna Weed Prosser (1846–1902), who did not marry but adopted three children; she was involved in the Divine Healing Movement of the late 1800s with Carrie Judd Montgomery.

After the death of his first wife, he married Kate Muldary, a native of Brooklyn, New York. They lived at 786 Delaware Avenue in Buffalo. In 1880, Kate committed suicide by jumping from the roof of a five story tenement at 430 East 14th Street in New York City. He married, thirdly, to Mary A. Finnegan of Buffalo.

Prosser died in Buffalo on May 11, 1888. He was buried at the Forest Lawn Cemetery, Buffalo.

Descendants
Through his son Henry, he was a grandfather of the banker and philanthropist Seward Prosser (1871–1942), who served as the head of Bankers Trust.

References

External links

His house (demolished 1911)

1809 births
1887 deaths
New York (state) state senators
Politicians from Buffalo, New York
Politicians from Albany, New York
New York (state) Republicans
Burials at Forest Lawn Cemetery (Buffalo)
New York (state) Democrats
New York (state) Free Soilers
People from Westerlo, New York